The following is a list providing an overview of private companies and state-owned enterprises that are active in the field of printing banknotes.

List

Historic printers

See also 

Security printing
List of mints

Notes

References 

Banknote printing companies